Binnein Shuas (747 m) is a mountain in the Grampian Mountains of Scotland. It lies between Loch Laggan and Lochan na h-Earba in Inverness-shire.

A steep hill of some character, it is a popular spot for rock-climbers as well as hill walkers, for its cliffs include the very difficult 'Ardverikie Wall'. The nearest village is Kinloch Laggan.

References

Marilyns of Scotland
Grahams
Mountains and hills of Highland (council area)